Bazhou is a district and the seat of Bazhong City, Sichuan Province, People's Republic of China.

Transportation 
Bazhong railway station is situated here.

External links
Official website of Bazhou District Government

Districts of Sichuan
Bazhong